In phonetics, ejective consonants are usually voiceless consonants that are pronounced with a glottalic egressive airstream. In the phonology of a particular language, ejectives may contrast with aspirated, voiced and tenuis consonants. Some languages have glottalized sonorants with creaky voice that pattern with ejectives phonologically, and other languages have ejectives that pattern with implosives, which has led to phonologists positing a phonological class of glottalic consonants, which includes ejectives.

Description
In producing an ejective, the stylohyoid muscle and digastric muscle contract, causing the hyoid bone and the connected glottis to raise, and the forward articulation (at the velum in the case of ) is held, raising air pressure greatly in the mouth so when the oral articulators separate, there is a dramatic burst of air. The Adam's apple may be seen moving when the sound is pronounced. In the languages in which they are more obvious, ejectives are often described as sounding like “spat” consonants, but ejectives are often quite weak. In some contexts and in some languages, they are easy to mistake for tenuis or even voiced stops. These weakly ejective articulations are sometimes called intermediates in older American linguistic literature and are notated with different phonetic symbols:  = strongly ejective,  = weakly ejective. Strong and weak ejectives have not been found to be contrastive in any natural language.

In strict, technical terms, ejectives are glottalic egressive consonants. In proportion to the frequency of uvular consonants,  is even more common, as would be expected from the very small oral cavity used to pronounce a voiceless uvular stop. , on the other hand, is quite rare. That is the opposite pattern to what is found in the implosive consonants, in which the bilabial is common and the velar is rare.

Occurrence
Ejectives occur in about 20% of the world's languages. Ejectives that phonemically contrast with pulmonic consonants occur in about 15% of languages around the world. The occurrence of ejectives often correlates to languages in mountainous regions such as the North American Cordillera, where ejectives are extremely common. They frequently occur throughout the Andes and Maya Mountains. They are also common in the East African Rift and the South African Plateau (see Geography of Africa). In Eurasia they are extremely common in the Caucasus, which forms an island of ejective languages. Elsewhere, they are rare.

Language families that distinguish ejective consonants include:
 Afroasiatic languages, especially in the Cushitic and Omotic branches, and in some languages of the Semitic (Ethio-Semitic and Modern South Arabian) and Chadic branches (e.g. Hausa)
 All three families of the Caucasus: the Northwest Caucasian languages (Circassian, Abkhaz and Ubykh); the Northeast Caucasian languages such as Chechen and Avar; and the Kartvelian languages such as Georgian
 the Athabaskan, Siouan and Salishan families of North America along with the many diverse families of the Pacific Northwest from central California to British Columbia
Mayan family, as well as neighboring Lencan languages and Xincan languages
Aymaran family
 the southern varieties of Quechua (Qusqu-Qullaw)
 Puelche and Tehuelche of the Chonan languages
Alacalufan family
 Gumuz, Meʼen, Tʼwampa and possibly other Nilo-Saharan languages
 Sandawe, Hadza, and the Khoisan families of southern Africa
 Itelmen of the Chukotko-Kamchatkan languages
 Yapese and Waima'a of the Austronesian family
According to the glottalic theory, the Proto-Indo-European language had a series of ejectives (or, in some versions, implosives), but no extant Indo-European language has retained them. Ejectives are found today in Ossetian only because of influence of the nearby Northeast Caucasian and/or Kartvelian language families.

It had once been predicted that ejectives and implosives would not be found in the same language but both have been found phonemically at several points of articulation in Nilo-Saharan languages (Gumuz, Me'en, and T'wampa), Mayan language (Yucatec), Salishan (Lushootseed), and the Oto-Manguean Mazahua. Nguni languages, such as Zulu have an implosive b alongside a series of allophonically ejective stops. Dahalo of Kenya, has ejectives, implosives, and click consonants.

Non-contrastively, ejectives are found in many varieties of British English, usually replacing word-final fortis plosives in utterance-final or emphatic contexts.

Types

A few languages have ejective fricatives. In some dialects of Hausa, the standard affricate  is a fricative ; Ubykh (Northwest Caucasian, now extinct) had an ejective lateral fricative ; and the related Kabardian also has ejective labiodental and alveolopalatal fricatives, . Tlingit is an extreme case, with ejective alveolar, lateral, velar, and uvular fricatives, ; it may be the only language with the last type. Upper Necaxa Totonac is unusual and perhaps unique in that it has ejective fricatives (alveolar, lateral, and postalveolar ) but lacks any ejective stop or affricate (Beck 2006). Amharic is interpreted by many as having an ejective fricative , at least historically, but it has been also analyzed as now being a sociolinguistic variant (Takkele Taddese 1992).

An ejective retroflex stop  is rare. It has been reported from Yawelmani and other Yokuts languages, Tolowa, and Gwich'in.

Because the complete closing of the glottis required to form an ejective makes voicing impossible, the allophonic voicing of ejective phonemes causes them to lose their glottalization; this occurs in Blin (modal voice) and Kabardian (creaky voice). A similar historical sound change also occurred in Veinakh and Lezgic in the Caucasus, and it has been postulated by the glottalic theory for Indo-European. Some Khoisan languages have voiced ejective stops and voiced ejective clicks; however, they actually contain mixed voicing, and the ejective release is voiceless.

s are rare, if they exist as distinct sounds at all. (An apostrophe is commonly seen with r, l and nasals, but that is Americanist phonetic notation for a glottalized consonant and does not indicate an ejective.)

Other ejective sonorants are not known to occur. When sonorants are transcribed with an apostrophe in the literature as if they were ejective, they actually involve a different airstream mechanism: they are glottalized consonants and vowels whose glottalization partially or fully interrupts an otherwise normal voiced pulmonic airstream, somewhat like English uh-uh (either vocalic or nasal) pronounced as a single sound. Often the constriction of the larynx causes it to rise in the vocal tract, but this is individual variation and not the initiator of the airflow. Such sounds generally remain voiced.

Orthography
In the International Phonetic Alphabet, ejectives are indicated with a "modifier letter apostrophe" , as in this article. A reversed apostrophe is sometimes used to represent light aspiration, as in Armenian linguistics ; this usage is obsolete in the IPA. In other transcription traditions (such as many romanisations of Russian, where it is transliterating the soft sign), the apostrophe represents palatalization:  = IPA . In some Americanist traditions, an apostrophe indicates weak ejection and an exclamation mark strong ejection: . In the IPA, the distinction might be written , but it seems that no language distinguishes degrees of ejection. Transcriptions of the Caucasian languages often utilize combining dots above or below a letter to indicate an ejective.

In alphabets using the Latin script, an IPA-like apostrophe for ejective consonants is common. However, there are other conventions.

List

Stops
bilabial ejective stop  (in Abkhaz, Adyghe, Amharic, Archi, Georgian, Mingrelian, Laz, Svan, Hadza, Kabardian, Lezgian, Lakota, Nez Perce, Quechua, Tigrinya, Zulu)
labialized bilabial ejective stop  (in Adyghe)
pharyngealized bilabial ejective stop  (in Ubykh)
dental ejective stop  (in Dahalo, Lakota, Tigrinya)
alveolar ejective stop  (in Abkhaz, Adyghe, Amharic, Archi, Avar, Bats, Kabardian, Georgian, Mingrelian, Laz, Svan, Gwich’in, Nez Perce, Quechua, Tlingit, Zulu)
labialized alveolar ejective stop  (in Abkhaz, Adyghe, Ubykh)
retroflex ejective stop  (in Gwich’in)
palatal ejective stop  (in Bats, Hausa, Giwi, Nez Perce)
velar ejective stop  (in Abaza, Abkhaz, Adyghe, Amharic, Archi, Avar, Georgian, Mingrelian, Laz, Svan, Giwi, Gwich’in, Hausa, Kabardian, Lakota, Nez Perce, Quechua, Sandawe, Tigrinya, Tlingit, Zulu)
palatalized velar ejective stop  (in Abaza, Abkhaz, Shapsug, Ubykh)
labialized velar ejective stop  (in Abaza, Abkhaz, Adyghe, Archi, Kabardian, Tlingit, Ubykh)
uvular ejective stop  (in Abaza, Abkhaz, Archi, Bats, Georgian, Mingrelian, Laz, Svan, Hakuchi, Nez Perce, Quechua, Tlingit)
palatalized uvular ejective stop  (in Abaza, Abkhaz, Ubykh)
labialized uvular ejective stop  (in Abaza, Abkhaz, Archi, Hakuchi, Tlingit, Ubykh)
pharyngealized uvular ejective stop  (in Archi, Ubykh)
labialized pharyngealized uvular ejective stop  (in Archi, Ubykh)
epiglottal ejective  (in Dargwa)

Affricates
labiodental ejective affricate  (in Venda)
dental ejective affricate  (in Chipewyan, Gwich’in)
alveolar ejective affricate  (in Abaza, Abkhaz, Adyghe, Amharic, Archi, Avar, Georgian, Mingrelian, Laz, Svan, Giwi, Gwich’in, Hadza, Hausa, Kabardian, Sandawe, Tigrinya, Tlingit, Ubykh)
labialized alveolar ejective affricate  (in Archi)
palato-alveolar ejective affricate  (in Abaza, Abkhaz, Adyghe, Amharic, Archi, Avar, Chipewyan, Georgian, Mingrelian, Laz, Svan, Gwich’in, Hadza, Hausa, Kabardian, Lakota, Quechua, Tigrinya, Tlingit, Ubykh, Zulu)
labialized palato-alveolar ejective affricate  (in Abaza, Archi)
retroflex ejective affricate  (in Abkhaz, Adyghe, Ubykh)
alveolo-palatal ejective affricate  (in Abaza, Abkhaz, Ubykh)
labialized alveolo-palatal ejective affricate  (in Abkhaz, Ubykh)
palatal ejective affricate 
velar ejective affricate  (in Hadza, Zulu)
uvular ejective affricate  (in Avar, Giwi, Lillooet)
alveolar lateral ejective affricate  (in Baslaney, Chipewyan, Dahalo, Gwich’in, Haida, Lillooet, Nez Perce, Sandawe, Tlingit, Tsez)
palatal lateral ejective affricate  (in Dahalo, Hadza)
velar lateral ejective affricate  (in Archi, Gǀui)
labialized velar lateral ejective affricate  (in Archi)

Fricatives
bilabial ejective fricative 
labiodental ejective fricative  (in Abaza, Kabardian)
dental ejective fricative  (in Chiwere)
alveolar ejective fricative  (in Chiwere, Lakota, Shapsug, Tlingit)
alveolar lateral ejective fricative  (in Abaza, Adyghe, Kabardian, Tlingit, Ubykh)
palato-alveolar ejective fricative  (in Adyghe, Lakota)
labialized palato-alveolar ejective fricative  (in Adyghe)
retroflex ejective fricative 
alveolo-palatal ejective fricative  (in Kabardian)
palatal ejective fricative 
velar ejective fricative  (in Tlingit)
labialized velar ejective fricative  (in Tlingit)
uvular ejective fricative  (in Tlingit)
labialized uvular ejective fricative  (in Tlingit)

Trills
alveolar ejective trill

Clicks
Simple ejective clicks  (all five in ǂ’Amkoe)
Ejective-contour clicks

 ~  ~ 
 ~  ~

Hypothesis
 argues that the geographic correlation between languages with ejectives and mountainous terrains is because of decreased air pressure making ejectives easier to produce, as well as the way ejectives help to reduce water vapor loss. The argument has been criticized as being based on a spurious correlation.

See also
Glottalic consonant
List of phonetics topics

Notes

References

Bibliography

Campbell, Lyle. 1973. On Glottalic Consonants. International Journal of American Linguistics 39, 44–46. 
Chirikba, V.A. Aspects of Phonological Typology. Moscow, 1991 (in Russian).

Fallon, Paul. 2002. The Synchronic and Diachronic Phonology of Ejectives. Routledge. , .

External links
Listen to Ejective Consonant
WALS map of languages with ejectives (blue and purple)